The large-billed seed finch (Sporophila crassirostris) is a species of bird in the family Thraupidae.

It is found in Brazil, Colombia, Ecuador, French Guiana, Guyana, Peru, Suriname, Trinidad and Tobago, and Venezuela. Its natural habitats are subtropical or tropical moist shrubland, swamps, and heavily degraded former forest.

Gallery

References

large-billed seed finch
Birds of the Amazon Basin
Birds of Colombia
Birds of Venezuela
Birds of Ecuador
Birds of Trinidad and Tobago
Birds of the Guianas
Birds of the Peruvian Amazon
large-billed seed finch
large-billed seed finch
Birds of Brazil
Taxonomy articles created by Polbot